LatencyTOP is a Linux application for identifying operating system latency within the kernel and find out the operations/actions which cause the latency. LatencyTOP is a tool for software developers to visualize system latencies. Based on these observations, the source code of the application or kernel can be modified to reduce latency. It was released by Intel in 2008 under the GPLv2 license. It works for Intel, AMD and ARM processors.

As of 2021, the project appears inactive with the last commit to the source code in October 2009.

See also

Green computing
PowerTOP
top (software)

References

External links
 

Linux process- and task-management-related software
Computers and the environment